Bischofferode is a village and a former municipality in the Eichsfeld district, in Thuringia, Germany. Since 1 December 2010, it is part of the municipality Am Ohmberg. Bischofferode consists of the subdivisions of Bischofferode, Hauröden and Siedlung "Thomas Müntzer".

Bischofferode and Holungen

The historical border of the area "Eichsfeld" goes straight through the drainage area of the two schools - Bischofferode and Holungen are dominated by the Catholic belief, that shows the traditional membership to the Eichsfeld. Hauröden is dominated by the Protestant belief, what shows, that the village was historically stronger linked to the Protestant area of Nordhausen and Sondershausen. (Hauröden has been a part of the district of Nordhausen until 1952).

It was first mentioned in 1186 as a convent village of the monastery in Gerode.

Little hamlets in the boundary: - Wenigenbischofferode - Husen - Poppenrode

The arms are The unprooting hoe and the crosier show the origin as an unprooting village and the bishop's property.

Economy

The people mainly earned their money in the agricultural production until the beginning of the 20th century. Then in 1909 the salt mine opened. It was the most important branch until 31 December 1993. This date was the end of the salt production in Bischofferode. Today the trade plays a more important role.

Village of Hauröden

The village Hauröden - hauröden has been a part of Bischofferode since 1974.
The first mention is: 1206 Howeritte 1370 Houenreden.
The village was nearly depopulated as a result of the Thirty Years' War.

Little hamlets in the boundary: Bennrode, Sipterode, Billrode.

Economy

Agricultural production and weaving were the first sources of income followed by the salt-mining. Working in the salt-mine meant better wages for the people. In 1897 a railway line was built, the housing estate "Neubleicherode" was founded and electricity introduced in 1917. A housing estate for the workers was built in Hauröden itself in 1919.

Sights/ tourist attractions

Church (Trinitatiskirche) built in 1617 in rustic baroque style - war memorial (1927) - very old lime tree (under protection) - "Hauröder Klippen" - a lookout in the hills of the Ohm Hills - restaurant "Hauröder Klippen" (in 1997 renovated, with rooms to let)

Church (Marienkirche) with a baroque tower and a modern interior decorating (projected by Prof. Tresst) - museum of the "potash union" - a lot of public footpaths

Population development 

Reference (from 1994): Thüringer Landesamt für Statistik

References

External links
Info on Bischofferode and its associations, e.g. Hasenhölzer

Former municipalities in Thuringia